The 1986 United States House of Representatives elections was held on November 4, 1986, to elect U.S. Representatives to serve in the 100th United States Congress. They occurred in the middle of President Ronald Reagan's second term in office, while he was still relatively popular with the American public. As in most mid-term elections, the President's party — in this case, the Republican Party — lost seats, with the Democratic Party gaining a net of five seats and cementing its majority. These results were not as dramatic as those in the Senate, where the Republicans lost control of the chamber to the Democrats.

Overall results

Source: Election Statistics - Office of the Clerk

Retiring incumbents
Forty incumbents retired.

Democrats 
Nineteen incumbent Democrats retired.
 : Richard Shelby: To run for U.S. senator
 : Tim Wirth: To run for U.S. senator
 : Don Fuqua
 : Wyche Fowler: To run for U.S. senator
 : Berkley Bedell
 : John Breaux: To run for U.S. senator
 : Catherine Small Long
 : Barbara Mikulski: To run for U.S. senator
 : Parren Mitchell
 : Michael D. Barnes: To run for U.S. senator
 : Tip O'Neill
 : Harry Reid: To run for U.S. senator
 : Stan Lundine: To run for Lieutenant Governor of New York
 : Charles Orville Whitley
 : John F. Seiberling
 : James R. Jones: To run for U.S. senator
 : Jim Weaver: To run for U.S. senator
 : Robert W. Edgar: To run for U.S. senator
 : Tom Daschle: To run for U.S. senator

Republicans 
Twenty-one incumbent Republicans retired.
 : John McCain: To run for U.S. senator
 : Eldon Rudd
 : Eugene A. Chappie
 : Ed Zschau: To run for U.S. senator
 : Bobbi Fiedler: To run for U.S. senator
 : Ken Kramer: To run for U.S. senator
 : George M. O'Brien
 : John E. Grotberg
 : Elwood Hillis
 : T. Cooper Evans
 : Gene Snyder
 : Henson Moore: To run for U.S. senator
 : John R. McKernan Jr.: To run for Governor of Maine
 : Marjorie Holt
 : William Carney
 : Tom Kindness: To run for U.S. senator
 : Thomas F. Hartnett: To run for Lieutenant Governor of South Carolina
 : Carroll A. Campbell Jr.: To run for Governor of South Carolina
 : Tom Loeffler: To run for Governor of Texas
 : David Smith Monson
 : G. William Whitehurst

Special elections 

Sorted by election date

Alabama

Alaska

Arizona

Arkansas

California

Colorado

Connecticut

Delaware

Florida

Georgia

Hawaii

Idaho

Illinois

Indiana

Iowa

Kansas

Kentucky

Louisiana

Maine

Maryland

Massachusetts

Michigan

Minnesota

Mississippi

Missouri

Montana

Nebraska

Nevada

New Hampshire

New Jersey

New Mexico

New York

North Carolina

North Dakota

Ohio

Oklahoma

Oregon

Pennsylvania

Rhode Island

South Carolina

South Dakota

Tennessee

Texas

Utah

Vermont

Virginia

Washington

West Virginia

Wisconsin 

|-
| 
| Les Aspin
|  | Democratic
| 1970
| Incumbent re-elected.
| nowrap | 

|-
| 
| Robert Kastenmeier
|  | Democratic
| 1958
| Incumbent re-elected.
| nowrap | 

|-
| 
| Steve Gunderson
|  | Republican
| 1980
| Incumbent re-elected.
| nowrap | 

|-
| 
| Jerry Kleczka
|  | Democratic
| 1984
| Incumbent re-elected.
| nowrap | 

|-
| 
| Jim Moody
|  | Democratic
| 1982
| Incumbent re-elected.
| nowrap | 

|-
| 
| Tom Petri
|  | Republican
| 1979 
| Incumbent re-elected.
| nowrap | 

|-
| 
| Dave Obey
|  | Democratic
| 1969 
| Incumbent re-elected.
| nowrap | 

|-
| 
| Toby Roth
|  | Republican
| 1978
| Incumbent re-elected.
| nowrap | 

|-
| 
| Jim Sensenbrenner
|  | Republican
| 1978
| Incumbent re-elected.
| nowrap | 

|}

Wyoming

See also
 1986 United States elections
 1986 United States gubernatorial elections
 1986 United States Senate elections
 99th United States Congress
 100th United States Congress

Notes

External links
Clerk of the House's election data